Alberto Mario González (21 August 1941 – 26 February 2023) was an Argentine footballe who played as a forward for Argentina in the 1962 and 1966 FIFA World Cups. He also played for Boca Juniors.

References

External links

FIFA profile

1941 births
2023 deaths
Argentine footballers
Footballers from Buenos Aires
Association football forwards
Argentina international footballers
Chilean Primera División players
Argentine Primera División players
Club Atlético Atlanta footballers
Club Atlético Banfield footballers
Boca Juniors footballers
Unión Española footballers
1962 FIFA World Cup players
1966 FIFA World Cup players
Argentine football managers
Boca Juniors managers
Argentine expatriate footballers
Argentine expatriate sportspeople in Chile
Expatriate footballers in Chile